The threadfin butterflyfish (Chaetodon auriga) is a species of marine ray-finned fish belonging to the family Chaetodontidae. It has a wide Indo-Pacific distribution.

Distribution
A single specimen was reported recently (2015) in the western Mediterranean Sea off Italy, a likely result of aquarium release.

Description
Its body is white with "chevron" markings on the side. The rear edge of the dorsal fin has a prominent black spot with a trailing filament behind it, and a black vertical band runs through the eye. The fish also has a belly patch of descending oblique dark lines and bright yellow fins. Two subspecies are sometimes recognised: Chaetodon auriga auriga occurs in the Red Sea and lacks the dorsal eyespot; Chaetodon auriga setifer is the spotted population occurring outside the Red Sea.

Taxonomy
It belongs to the large subgenus Rabdophorus which might warrant recognition as a distinct genus. Within this group, it is almost certainly a rather close relative of the vagabond butterflyfish (C. vagabundus) and the Indian vagabond butterflyfish (C. decussatus). The C. auriga species group shares the characteristic pattern of two areas of ascending and descending oblique lines, but they differ conspicuously in hindpart coloration.

References

External links

 

threadfin butterflyfish
Fish of the Pacific Ocean
Fish of the Red Sea
Fish of Hawaii
threadfin butterflyfish
Taxa named by Peter Forsskål